Patricia Ann "Tisha" Sterling (born December 10, 1944) is a retired American actress. She is the only daughter of actor Robert Sterling and actress Ann Sothern.

Life and career
Sterling was born in Los Angeles, California. Her parents divorced when she was three years old.

Sterling started acting in the 1960s with an appearance on her mother's television series The Ann Sothern Show. She later appeared in episodes of The Donna Reed Show; The Long, Hot Summer; Bonanza; Batman episodes 43 and 44 as Legs, the daughter of Ma Parker (played by Shelley Winters); The Name of the Game; The Bold Ones: The Lawyers; Hawaii Five-O; Columbo and The New Adventures of Perry Mason. She appeared in the feature films Village of the Giants (1965), Coogan's Bluff (1968), and Norwood (1970).

In 1987, Sterling played a younger version of her mother's character (in flashbacks) in The Whales of August. Following that role, she appeared in two other films. Sterling made her last onscreen appearance in Breakfast of Champions (1999), opposite Bruce Willis. She has since retired from acting, and works as a florist in Ketchum, Idaho (where her mother lived for many years until her death in 2001) with her daughter, Heidi Bates Hogan. Sterling was married to Lal Baum (1937–1987), the great-grandson of author  L. Frank Baum, from 1965 until 1970. Baum died of a brain tumor on July 21, 1987.

Filmography

Film

Television

References

External links

 

1944 births
20th-century American actresses
Actresses from Los Angeles
American film actresses
American television actresses
Living people
People from Ketchum, Idaho
21st-century American women